McSweeney is a surname of Norse-Gaelic origin. It is the Anglicized form of the Gaelic Mac Sween or Swein, meaning "son of Suibhne". Despite claims that the personal name Suibhne is of Irish origin and derived from suibneus, suaimhneas, meaning "easy-going", or "pleasant", the eponymous ancestor of the McSweeneys was of Norse-Gaelic descent. According to the Annals of Tigernacht,  Swein, Son of Cinaid (Kenneth), King of the Gal-Gaidhil, Died 1034 AD. Claims of the McSweeneys being of Irish origin and descendants of the O'Neills are entirely false and would appear to have been made up for two purposes - firstly to smooth their way into medieval Tyr Connail, where they conquered territory and became kingmakers, protectors and fosterers to the O'Donnells, who ruled that part of Ireland, and secondly, so it wouldn't appear that the O'Neills were having to rely on foreigners to do their fighting for them - especially as the 'cessing' of galoglas warriors would have been costly to the local population, as each man would have been awarded land and cattle. Although the McSweeneys undoubtedly had Irish connections going back centuries, Swein was actually a descendant of the Ui Imair, or House of Ivar (The 'Boneless'). Notable people with the surname include:

 Ailis McSweeney (born 1983), Irish sprinter specialising in the 100 metre event
 Alex McSweeney, British actor who appeared on the TV show EastEnders (2003–2004)
 Alf McSweeney, printer who founded the magazine Race Walking Record in 1941, and edited the magazine for 16 years
 Barry McSweeney, Irish scientist and the first Chief Science Advisor to the Government of Ireland
 Dave McSweeney (born 1981), English footballer, senior career began in 2000
 David McSweeney (politician) (born 1965), Investment banker who was the Republican candidate in Illinois's 8th congressional district election, 2006
 Ella McSweeney (born 1978), Irish radio and television presenter and producer
 Ervin McSweeney (born 1957), New Zealand cricketer who played 16 One Day Internationals in the 1980s
 James McSweeney (born 1980), English mixed martial arts fighter and former Muay Thai kickboxer 
 John McSweeney, known as John Zewizz (born 1955), English-born American industrial music performer
 John McSweeney (Ohio politician) (1890–1969), United States congressman representing Ohio
 Joyelle McSweeney (born 1976), poet, critic, and professor at the University of Notre Dame
 Leah McSweeney (born 1982), founder and CEO of the "Married to the MOB" clothing line
 Leon McSweeney (born 1983), Irish footballer, senior career began in 2000
 Miles Benjamin McSweeney (1855–1909), 87th Governor of South Carolina (1899–1903)
 Neil McSweeney (born 1976) Songwriter and musician based in Sheffield, England
 Peter McSweeney (1842–1921), merchant and politician who represented the Northumberland division in Canadian Senate (1899–1921)
 Robyn McSweeney (born 1957), Australian politician, member of the Legislative Council in the state of Western Australia
 Trash McSweeney, Australian musician and lead singer for the band The Red Paintings

See also
 McSween (surname)
 McSweeney's, an American publishing house
 Timothy McSweeney's Quarterly Concern, a literary journal published by the McSweeney's publishing house